The thirteenth season of the American television series Whose Line Is It Anyway? premiered on The CW on May 29, 2017, and concluded on September 28, 2017.

Cast

Recurring  
 Jonathan Mangum (four episodes)
 Jeff Davis (three episodes)
 Gary Anthony Williams (three episodes)
 Heather Anne Campbell (two episodes)
 Brad Sherwood (two episodes)
 Greg Proops (one episode)

Special Guest 
Charles "Chip" Esten (one episode)

Episodes 

"Winner(s)" of each episode as chosen by host Aisha Tyler are highlighted in italics. The winner(s) perform a sketch during the credit roll, just like in the original UK series.

References

External links
Whose Line Is It Anyway? (U.S.) (a Titles & Air Dates Guide)
Mark's guide to Whose Line is it Anyway? - Episode Guide

Whose Line Is It Anyway?
2017 American television seasons